Euphaedra ignota, the Ghana Ceres forester, is a butterfly in the family Nymphalidae. It is found in Ghana. The habitat consists of dense forests.

References

Butterflies described in 1996
ignota
Endemic fauna of Ghana
Butterflies of Africa